McPherson Township is one of the thirteen townships of Sherman County, Kansas, United States.  The population was 52 at the 2000 census.

Geography
Located in the southwestern corner of the county, along the Colorado border, it borders the following townships:
Stateline Township — north
Lincoln Township — northeast
Smoky Township — east
Sharon Springs Township, Wallace County — southeast
Weskan Township, Wallace County — southwest
Kit Carson County lies across the Colorado border to the west.

It lies southwest of the county seat of Goodland.  There are no communities in the township.

The north fork of the Smoky Hill River flows through McPherson Township.

Transportation
Only local roads are located in McPherson Township.

Government
As an active township, McPherson Township is governed by a three-member board, composed of the township trustee, the township treasurer, and the township clerk.  The trustee acts as the township executive.

References

External links
County website

Townships in Sherman County, Kansas
Townships in Kansas